Abe Berenbaum was a male American international table tennis player.

Table tennis career
He won a bronze medal in the mixed doubles with Emily Fuller at the 1937 World Table Tennis Championships and a gold medal in the team event at the 1937 World Table Tennis Championships.  He also won two English Open titles.

Hall of Fame
He was inducted into the USA Hall of Fame in 1979.

See also
 List of table tennis players
 List of World Table Tennis Championships medalists

References

American male table tennis players
World Table Tennis Championships medalists
20th-century American people